Block 17 is a luxury high-rise apartment building in Portland, Oregon's Pearl District. Opened in 2015, its 16 stories contain a total 285 units. With some units sold for up to $3.74 per square foot, they are some of the city's most expensive. Some of its units are rented as hotel rooms, in violation of existing regulations and to the dissatisfaction of renters.

References

External links
 

2015 establishments in Oregon
Buildings and structures in Portland, Oregon
Pearl District, Portland, Oregon
Residential buildings completed in 2015